Kasrik is a belde in the central district of Şırnak Province in Turkey. The settlement is populated by Kurds of the Botikan tribe and had a population of 3,396 in 2021.

References 

Kurdish settlements in Şırnak Province
Populated places in Şırnak Province